

Champions
World Series: Pittsburgh Pirates over Detroit Tigers (4–3)

MLB statistical leaders

Major league baseball final standings

American League final standings

National League final standings

Events
February 19 - The Boston Red Sox trade pitcher Cy Young to the Cleveland Naps in exchange for pitchers Charlie Chech, Jack Ryan and $12,500 cash. 
April 15 – On Opening Day, Red Ames of the New York Giants allowed no hits through nine innings. In the 10th inning he gave up a single with one out. The Giants eventually fell to the Brooklyn Superbas, 3–0, in 13 innings. In total, Ames allowed a total of seven hits.
May 10 – Fred Toney pitches a 17-inning no-hitter for the Winchester Hustlers of the Blue Grass League. Toney has 19 strikeouts and 1 walk in the 1-0 victory. In 1917, Toney will pitch a 10-inning no-hitter in the major leagues.
July 2 – The Chicago White Sox collected 12 stolen bases in the course of a 15–3 victory over the St. Louis Browns. Three are steals of home, including one by pitcher Ed Walsh in the sixth inning.
July 15 - The Brooklyn Superbas purchase the contract of outfielder Zach Wheat from Mobile of the Southern Association. 
July 19 – In the second inning of the first game of a doubleheader, Cleveland Naps shortstop Neal Ball becomes the first player in Major League Baseball history to turn an undisputed unassisted triple play. With two men on base, Neal caught a line drive hit by Amby McConnell, then gets Heinie Wagner at second base, and later tagged Jake Stahl to complete the feat. Cleveland defeated the Boston Red Sox, 6–1, while Cy Young was credited as the winning pitcher.
 August 31 –  A.J. Reach Company is granted a patent for its cork-centered baseball, which will replace the hard rubber-cored one. This change will be particularly apparent in the National League in 1910 and 1911.
 September 27 - The New York Giants defeat the Pittsburgh Pirates, 8–7, to snap the Pirates' sixteen game winning streak. 
October 16 – The Pittsburgh Pirates defeat the Detroit Tigers, 8–0, in Game 7 of the World Series, winning their first modern World Championship, four games to three. Rookie pitcher Babe Adams earned his third victory of the series, while completing each of the games. The Tigers thus became the first American League team to win three consecutive pennants, and the first team to lose three straight World Series.
November 26 – The Philadelphia Phillies are sold for $350,000 to a group headed by sportswriter Horace Fogel. Because of his dual roles, Fogel will become the only executive barred from a league meeting.

Births

January
January 2 – Bobby Reis
January 8 – Al Reiss
January 13 – Spades Wood
January 20 – William Eckert
January 21 – Bill Karlon
January 29 – Red Howell
January 31 – Emil Planeta

February
February 13 – George Gill
February 13 – Ernie Rudolph
February 15 – Dee Miles
February 22 – Art Bramhall
February 24 – Steamboat Struss
February 28 – Lefty Bertrand
February 28 – Whitey Hilcher

March
March 2 – Mel Ott
March 8 – Pete Fox
March 13 – Harry Kimberlin
March 22 – Ed Cole
March 23 – Chile Gómez
March 25 – Dutch Leonard
March 26 – Alex Mustaikis
March 28 – Lon Warneke

April
April 9 – Claude Passeau
April 10 – Jim Spotts
April 12 – Eric McNair
April 17 – Chuck Sheerin
April 19 – Bucky Walters
April 21 – Jim Boyer
April 21 – Bill Chamberlain
April 27 – John Whitehead

May
May 1 – Bill Dunlap
May 7 – Ed Heusser
May 13 – Leroy Morney
May 21 – Mace Brown
May 21 – Dick Ward
May 27 – Pinky Higgins

June
June 1 – Jo-Jo White
June 19 – Casper Asbjornson
June 28 – Haruyasu Nakajima

July
July 2 – Gil English
July 7 – Billy Herman
July 9 – Jimmy Shevlin
July 15 – John Jackson
July 15 – Red Kellett
July 20 – Otto Bluege
July 25 – Sherman Edwards

August
August 2 – Bill Phebus
August 3 – George Meyer
August 6 – Al Veach
August 12 – Skinny Graham
August 20 – Sig Jakucki
August 22 – Bob Keely
August 26 – Gene Moore
August 29 – Buck Marrow

September
September 7 – Eddie Wilson
September 9 – Johnny Marcum
September 17 – Ernie Koy
September 18 – Rip Collins
September 19 – Hersh Martin
September 19 – Frank Reiber
September 21 – Al Blanche
September 23 – Al Mahon
September 24 – Johnny Reder
September 29 – Oris Hockett

October
October 3 – Johnny Broaca
October 6 – Walt Bashore
October 7 – Tony Malinosky
October 9 – Jim Winford
October 14 – Jimmy Ripple
October 15 – Mel Harder
October 16 – Oliver Hill
October 18 – Orie Arntzen
October 20 – Bruce Campbell
October 21 – Bill Lee
October 25 – Mickey Haslin
October 29 – Ralph Winegarner

November
November 4 – Skeeter Webb
November 4 – Jake Dunn
November 5 – Harry Gumbert
November 5 – Les Powers
November 13 – Bob Garbark
November 16 – Bill McGee
November 18 – Joe Coscarart
November 18 – Spike Merena
November 24 – Tom Winsett
November 29 – Gus Brittain
November 30 – Jimmie DeShong

December
December 6 – Stan Hack
December 9 – Bob Kline
December 10 – Floyd Giebell
December 11 – Jim Bivin
December 13 – Dick Newsome
December 14 – Jim Walkup
December 23 – Art Passarella

Deaths

January–March
January 2 – Paddy Quinn, 59, catcher/outfielder for the Kekiongas/Western/Dark Blues/White Stockings National Association teams from 1871 to 1877.
January 14 – Togie Pittinger, 37, pitcher who posted a 115–113 record and a 3.10 ERA in eight seasons with the Boston Beaneaters (1900–1904) and Philadelphia Phillies (1905–1907).
January 19 – Dennis Casey, 50, center fielder for the Wilmington Quicksteps (1884) and Baltimore Orioles (1884–1885).
February 4 – John Clarkson, 47, pitcher for Chicago, Boston and Cleveland who won over 325 games, then a National League record with six 30-win seasons, including 53 and a no-hitter (1885); leading the league for the most innings pitched four times, and in strikeouts, games and complete games three times each.
February 17 – Jim Burns, [?],  outfielder for the Kansas City Cowboys (1888) and Washington Statesmen (1891) of the American Association.
February 20 – John Hatfield, 61, left fielder/infielder for the New York Mutuals.
March 15 – Howard Wall, 54, shortstop who played one game for the 1873 Washington Blue Legs.

April–June
April 3 – George Barclay, 42, left fielder for the St. Louis Cardinals (1902–1904) and the Boston Beaneaters (1904–1905), who also was credited with inventing the first-ever football helmet in 1896.
April 6 – Doggie Miller, 44, catcher for Pittsburgh from 1884 to 1893 who scored 80 runs five times, batted .339 for 1894 St. Louis Browns.
April 13 – Fred Cone, 60, outfielder for the 1871 Boston Red Stockings.
April 17 – Oscar Westerberg, 27, shortstop for the 1907 Boston Doves of the National League.
April 26 – Mike Dorgan, 55, Outfielder for 10 seasons, and player-manager for three, from 1877–1890.
April 29 – Doc Powers, 38, who was catching in the first game played in Shibe Park in Philadelphia when he crashed into a wall going after a pop fly. He remained in the game, but suffered from internal injuries that took his life two weeks later, when gangrene set in after three operations. He was the first major leaguer to die from injuries sustained during a game.
June 20 – Rudy Kemmler, 49?, catcher for eight seasons from 1879 to 1889.

July–September
July 5 – Frank Selee, 49, manager who guided Boston to five National League pennants (1891–93, 1895–96) and later built foundation of championship Cubs teams, collecting a .607 winning percentage –highest among managers of 1500 games–, and 1284 victories to rank second all-time upon retirement.
August 22 – Harry Lochhead, 33, shortstop for the Cleveland Spiders (1899) and Detroit Tigers (1901).
September 5 – Bill Popp, 32, pitcher who posted a 2–6 record in nine games for the 1902 St. Louis Cardinals.
September 17 – Herman Long, 43, shortstop for the Boston Beaneaters who batted .300 four times, led NL in runs in 1893 and home runs in 1900; set career marks for putouts and total chances, led league in double plays three times and in putouts and fielding average twice each.
September 20 – Joe Wright, 40, center fielder for the Louisville Colonels (1895) and Pittsburgh Pirates (1896).

October–December
October 13 – Sleeper Sullivan, 50, Irish catcher who played for the Brown Stockings/Bisons/Browns/Maroons/Eclipse teams from 1881 to 1884.
October 26 – Frank Siffell, German catcher for the Philadelphia Athletics of the American Association (1884–1885).
October 29 – John Lyston, 42, pitcher  for the Columbus Solons (1891) and Cleveland Spiders (1894).
November 5 – Walt Kinzie, 51, shortstop for the Wolverines, White Stockings and Browns from 1882 to 1884.
December 8 – Buffalo Bill Hogg, 27, pitcher who posted a 37–50 record in four seasons with the New York Highlanders of the American League (1905–1908).
December 21 – Kid Keenan, 40, pitcher for the 1891 Cincinnati Kelly's Killers of the American Association.
December 22 – Jimmy Sebring, 27, outfielder for the Pittsburgh, Cincinnati, Brooklyn and Washington teams from 1902 to 1909, who became the first player in World Series history to hit a home run (1903).
December 23 – Harry H. Gilbert, 41, second baseman for the 1890 Pittsburgh Alleghenys of the National League..